Mansour Hazrati (born 14 April 1932) is an Iranian wrestler. He competed in the men's Greco-Roman middleweight at the 1960 Summer Olympics.

References

External links
 

1932 births
Living people
Iranian male sport wrestlers
Olympic wrestlers of Iran
Wrestlers at the 1960 Summer Olympics
Sportspeople from Tehran